Bill Neal (born December 28, 1931) is a former American football player and coach. He served as the head football coach at Indiana University of Pennsylvania from 1970 to 1978, compiling a record of 50–31–3.

Neal was born on December 28, 1931, in Russell, Kentucky. He began his coaching career at George Washington University, where was an assistant coach for seven years, from 1954 to 1960.

Head coaching record

References

1931 births
Living people
George Washington Colonials football coaches
George Washington Colonials football players
IUP Crimson Hawks football coaches
Navy Midshipmen football coaches
Pittsburgh Panthers football coaches
Virginia Cavaliers football coaches